Dhi (Sanskrit: धी) is a Sanskrit word meaning 'understanding', 'reflection', 'religious thought', 'mind', 'design', 'intelligence', 'opinion', 'meditation', 'imagination', 'notion', and 'intellect'. This word is directly connected with the word Vāc (Sanskrit: वाच), meaning Speech, derived from Vac (Sanskrit: वच) meaning, 'to speak'. Dhi is the voiced Vāc or 'Speech', it is the thought-mind or intellect. Dhi also means 'to hold' or 'to place', and indicates the activity of the intellect.

Overview

The natural meaning of Dhi is 'Thought' which corresponds to the Sanskrit word Buddhi which means 'the activity of mind', 'thought', 'understanding' and 'intelligence'. Vedic Sanskrit employs two words Dhi and Brahman for prayerful or meditative contemplation in which context Dhi means 'visionary insight', 'intense thought and reflection', and the word Brahman is derived from the root brh, meaning 'to grow', 'to expand'.
Manu Smriti describes ten essential rules for observance of Dharma (the path of righteousness or the 'Law of Being', which binds the people of this world and the whole creation) – Dhriti ('patience'), Kshama ('forgiveness'), Dama ('self-control'), Asteya ('honesty'), Shaucha ('purity'), Indriya-nigrah ('control of senses'), Dhi ('reasoning'), Vidya ('knowledge and learning'), Satya ('truthfulness') and Akrodha ('control of anger').

Application

Dhi, the prefix of Dhimahi and Dhiyo occurring in the Gayatri Mantra (Rig VedaIII.62.10) refers to 'understanding', and its cognate word Buddhi means 'reasoning faculty of the mind', which understanding must be transcended to experience the Ultimate Reality. The word, Dhira, meaning 'calm', denotes the seeker whose intellect is saturated in knowledge which word is the combination of Dhi meaning 'intellect' and ra meaning 'fire' or 'wisdom'.
The Non-Atman i.e. the Anatman, which is by its nature disagreeable, is the object of the function of Dhi (=buddhi) which reveals the joy (ananda), the nature of the individual consciousness.
Patanjali defines Yoga as neutralization of the alternating waves in consciousness; in the phrase citta vritti nirodha (Yoga Sutra I.2), Citta refers to the 'thinking principle' and includes 'pranic life forces', to Manas ('mind' or 'sense consciousness'), Ahamkara ('egoity') and Buddhi ('intuitive intelligence'), and Vritti refers to the waves of thought and emotion that ceaselessly arise and Nirodha refers to 'neutralization', 'cessation' or 'control'. The root budh and its derivatives appear in the Vedas in the sense of 'kindling' or 'awakening', the word buddhi appears for the first time in Samkhyayana Brahmana Upanishad. Dhi is derived from dhriti and its cognate didhiti, it also refers to flash of intuition which is beyond all purely sensuous perception. The mental organs are manas ('mind') and hrd ('heart'), and the mental faculties are citta ('thought'), dhi ('mental vision') and kratu ('mental power'). Manas is said to perform the processes indicated by the verbal roots 'cit-, dhi- and man-; dhi requires kratu in actualizing visions.

Connection with Vāc

Dhi refers to 'vision' or 'inspiration which is the exceptional faculty of acquiring a sudden knowledge of transcendent truth or reality', 'the inner light of visionary insight'. Soma is the Lord of Vision who dispenses inspiration and Speech (Vāc) is inspired thought (manisa) or wisdom guarded by the seers on the seat of Rta. The Rig Veda links language not only to thought (manas) but also to vision (dhi), a word from which comes Dhyana meaning 'meditation'.
In the Yajurveda (29.8), Sarasvati, the Goddess of Speech, is invoked to grant the gift of Dhi, inspired thought, and thought is linked with Vāc; Sarasvati is also known as the river of inspired thought,

The Vedas are the sacred texts of the Hindus. They are the repository of what is the known or required to be known, in other words, the true knowledge or the transcendent eternal wisdom articulated in Sound ('sabda') or Speech ('vāc'). The Vedic seers have associated the power of speech or the spoken word with ultimacy and transcendence – ekam sat (Rig Veda I.164.46). They also know Vishwakarma, the creator, as Vācaspati, the Lord of Speech (Rig Veda X.81.7) (who is also called Brihaspati and Brahmanaspati), and that Vāc or speech or utterance as Brahman is the creative principle and the absolute force in the universe; the person who has gained its knowledge is said to have attained the highest knowledge (Rig Veda X.125.5). As far as Brahman extends so far does Vāc (Rig Veda X.114.8).

Role of Vāc

The Inspired thought (dhi) that precedes utterance though connected with speech undergoes some modifications while being transformed into speech; the Vedic Rishis tell us that the thoughtful one's produce speech with their mind (Rig Veda X.71.2), the different stages in transformation from dhi to vāc are described in the Atharvaveda (VII.1.1). Dhi is the voiced speech. Goddess Saraswati presides over speech but vāc extends far above and beyond Saraswati (Rig Veda X.125) beyond all known spheres (Rig Veda X.114.8). Vāc is dependent on breath or air; and the Aitareya Brahmana (IV.42.1) states Brahman vai vāk, Vāc is the mother of the Vedas and the Vedas themselves (Shatapatha Brahmana (6.5.3.4).
The Vedas are a form of the ritual and cosmological Vāc (speech). Vāc is presented as consort of Prajapati (Kathaka Samhita 12.5.27.1) whom the Brahmanas  express as 'the expressed' (nirukta) and as the 'unexpressed' (anirukta), the limited and the unlimited. Taittiriya Aranyaka tells us that Vāc is the imperishable one, the (Aksara), the first-born of the cosmic order (Rta), the mother of the Vedas (vedanam mata), the navel of immortality (Amrita) and therefore Vedas themselves are infinite (Ananta), immortal (amrta) and imperishable (akshita). The Jaiminiya Upanishad tells us that Aum or Om, the essence of all essences, is Vāc. On the human plane the mind precedes speech, and on the cosmic plane Prajapati precedes vāc as the Lord of Thought and Speech, who brings forth vāc to unite with vāc to manifest creation.
Vāc was probably the language commonly spoken by the Vedic people as the language of men. Vāc is another name for Aditi or Viraj.

For the purpose of invoking Agni and other devatas, the mantras of the Rig Veda have a very essential role to play because the Upasaka when meditating is required to think of the Rcs as Vāc i.e. speech; it is for this reason that the mantras are chanted and there is a prescribed way to do that chanting. Rishi Medhatithi Kanva (Rig Veda I.12.11) prays:

स नः सत्वान आ भर गायत्रेन नवीयसा |
रयिं वीरवतिमिषम् ||

"May Agni accept the words of praise (adoration) set in newer hymns composed in Gayatri metre and devoutly sung (chanted), (May Agni) accept the oblations made in it (in the prescribed manner) of the offerings rightly earned and belonging to the performers of rites." And, Rishi Ayasya (Rig Veda IX.46.2) praying thus-

परिष्कृतास इन्दवो योषेव पित्र्यावती |
वायुं सोमा असृक्षत ||

informs us that having acquired the knowledge of the highest the learned people (easily) unravel the deeply hidden meaning of the most subtle kind. This means, that each experience of ours is a re-discovery of ourselves, and that in order to really re-discover ourselves so as to understand our true nature we have to firstly awaken our mind, then make the mind speak loudly enough to be heard because Prana, which is the body of the mind, is that very silence waiting to be heard. A sage of the Rig Veda (Rig Veda X.20.9) states that the creator vested Agni with three coloured flames and made it brilliant, eminent, swift-acting and hot. The sage of the Chandogya Upanishad tells us that behind all things are these three colours, the rest constituted out of them are a modification and a name. Speech is Rk or Brhati identified with Prana whose lord is Brihaspati, the same lord is Brahmanaspati when speech is Yajus associated with Brahman. Speech is Sama; it cannot reveal itself for it is as formless as the air on which it rides; it rides upon the streams of air constituting the wind, and words once uttered do not return to the speaker.

Yajnavalkya tells King Janaka that the light that comes nearest to the supreme light of the Atman is the light of Vāc i.e. speech, since it is the supreme faculty of reason that finally lifts the consciousness towards the pure self-shining awareness of the Atman, and which after serving as a pointer vanishes or goes to rest. The Vedic sages have all along advocated 'Truth', 'Penance' and 'Study' as special virtues. Amongst these three special virtues Truth is held out to be the supreme virtue to be practised by all aspirants. All primary virtues are firstly imbibed from the parents; Satyakama Jabala acquired the spirit of truthfulness from his mother, and Sanat Kumara taught Narada that Truth has to be sought for realization – "when one indeed understands Truth in its reality one speaks the truth".

While describing the rituals associated with the Ashvamedha yajna, in the Brihadaranyaka Upanishad we are told that the neighing of the horse, representing the cosmos, is Vāc.

Claim for primacy

A sage of the Chandogya Upanishad after declaring that the syllable Aum, having the individual and also the cosmic efficacy, not only serves to help the meditation of the individual person but even the Sun travels the universe singing Aum as does Prana moving in the body (Ch.Up.I.5.1,3) explains that that Aum is the essence of all beings on this earth, the essence of a person is speech and the essence of speech is the Rig Veda (Ch.Up.I.1.2) but the essence of Samaveda, which is the essence of the Rig Veda, is Udgitha which is Aum. He declares that all speech is interwoven on the symbol Aum, in the same manner as the leaves of a tree are woven together on a stalk (Ch.Up.II.23.3). Speech is the fuel of fire which is man (Ch.Up.V.7.1). Mind consists of 'food', the Prana consists of 'water' and speech consists of 'fire' (Ch.Up.VI.6.5). Narada is told by Sanat Kumara that all this is but a name by which one knows, even then speech is greater than name because if there is no speech neither righteousness nor unrighteousness would be known, but surely the mind is greater than speech for mind  is the entire world (Ch.Up.VII.2 & 3) establishing the claim of the mind (dhi) for primacy over speech (vāc).

References

Hindu philosophical concepts
Language and mysticism
Philosophy of mind
Sanskrit words and phrases
Vedanta